Liisa Linko-Malmio (28 May 1917 — 8 December 2017) was a Finnish operatic soprano and a voice pedagog.

Early life and education
Liisa Linko was born into a musical family: her father was the pianist and composer, professor , her mother singer (mezzosoprano)  ( Helén), her paternal grandfather choirmaster , and two of her uncles conductor  and choirmaster .

She went to school initially at the Helsinki Finnish Co-educational School, but did not get on well, to the extent that she was sent to Tampere to complete her secondary education. She graduated in 1937, and was accepted to study at the Sibelius Academy in Helsinki, initially the piano, but switching soon to study singing under her mother. She later continued her studies in Berlin, at the conservatories of Vienna, Salzburg, Moscow and Leningrad, as well as through numerous study trips to Sweden, Germany, the USA and the UK.

Career

Singing
Linko-Malmio was attached to the Finnish National Opera on three different occasions between 1940 and 1960, as well as to the opera houses of Bremen (1943) and Copenhagen (1951-1955).

At the National Opera, Linko-Malmio performed over 350 times, in roles including Pamina in Magic Flute, a Flowermaiden in Parsifal, Dorabella in Cosi Fan Tutte, the Countess in Marriage of Figaro, and later, the title roles in Tosca, Aida and Madame Butterfly.

She also made numerous concert and operatic guest appearances around Europe, including Vienna, London, Stockholm, Frankfurt and Moscow.

Teaching
In 1961, Linko-Malmio was appointed to teach singing at the Sibelius Academy, and in 1963 promoted to tenured lecturer in solo voice. She remained there for forty years, continuing to teach on part-time basis well into her 80s.

She also taught at the Savonlinna Opera Festival's Lied masterclasses in the early 1970s.

The most famous of her numerous students were perhaps Karita Mattila and Anu Komsi.

Awards and honours
In 1957, Linko-Malmio received the  medal of the Order of the Lion of Finland,

In 1977, the honorary title of Professori was conferred on Linko-Malmio.

Personal life
In 1943, Liisa Linko married architect , and the couple had two sons and one daughter.

References

1917 births
2017 deaths
Finnish sopranos
Finnish centenarians
Women centenarians
People from Priozersk
Sibelius Academy alumni
Academic staff of Sibelius Academy
Pro Finlandia Medals of the Order of the Lion of Finland